Klais station is a railway station in the Klais district of the municipality of Krün, located in the Garmisch-Partenkirchen district in Bavaria, Germany.

References

Railway stations in Bavaria
Buildings and structures in Garmisch-Partenkirchen (district)